Palms of Pasadena Hospital is a hospital located in St. Petersburg, Florida.

External links 
 Official Hospital Website

References 

Hospitals in Florida
Buildings and structures in St. Petersburg, Florida